Jerzy Bończak (born 29 July 1949 in Bieżuń) is a Polish actor. He appeared in the  television series Aby do świtu... in 1992. He also played Daniel Czapliński in the Polish movie With Fire and Sword.

Selected filmography
 Teddy Bear (1980)
 Olympics 40 (1980)
 The Tribulations of Balthazar Kober (1988)
 Nothing Funny (1995)
 A Trap (1997)
 With Fire and Sword (1999)
 Battle of Warsaw 1920 (2011)

References

1949 births
Living people
Polish male film actors
Polish male television actors
20th-century Polish male actors
Polish male soap opera actors
Polish male stage actors
People from Żuromin County